Dipendra may refer to:

 Dipendra of Nepal
 Dipendra Singh Airee
 Dipendra Chaudhary
 Dipendra Jha
 Dipendra K. Khanal
 Dipendra Prasad
 Dipendra Shrestha